Norwegian of the Year is a distinction awarded by the leftist news magazine Ny Tid (lit. 'New Age'). Established in 2007, the prize has been awarded to several persons, including Norwegian citizens of foreign origin and a German citizen living in Norway.

History 
'Northman') more specifically whether Norwegian citizens of foreign origin should be called nordmann or—considered as more neutral—norsk (an adjective), the magazine instituted the distinction Årets nordmann, i.e. 'Norwegian of the Year', in 2007. The first recipient was actress Kohinoor Nordberg, originally from Bangladesh.

List of recipients

References 

Norwegian awards